FC Medyk Morshyn was a Ukrainian football club from Morshyn, Lviv Oblast.

League and cup history

{|class="wikitable"
|-bgcolor="#efefef"
! Season
! Div.
! Pos.
! Pl.
! W
! D
! L
! GS
! GA
! P
!Domestic Cup
!colspan=2|Europe
!Notes
|-
|1993–94
|3rd (lower)
|18
|34
|3
|4
|27
|15
|78
|11
|DNP
|—
|—
|Relegated
|-
|1994–95
|4th
|6
|26
|9
|4
|11
|28
|40
|31
|
|—
|—
|
|-
|1996–97
|4th
|4
|12
|2
|2
|8
|5
|18
|8
|
|—
|—
|
|}

External links
 1993–94 Ukrainian Third League standing
 Medyk Morshyn at footballfacts.ru

See also
FC Skala Morshyn

Medyk Morshyn, FC
Football clubs in Lviv Oblast
Association football clubs disestablished in 1997
1997 disestablishments in Ukraine